Jacky van der Ende (born 20 November 1976 in South Holland, Maasdijk) is a Dutch racing driver. He won both the British Formula Ford Championship and the Formula Ford Festival in 1997.

References

External links
 
 

1976 births
Living people
Dutch racing drivers
Formula Ford drivers
German Formula Three Championship drivers
Formula Palmer Audi drivers
Auto GP drivers
People from Naaldwijk
Porsche Supercup drivers
Sportspeople from South Holland

Van Amersfoort Racing drivers
24H Series drivers